Neomastogenius hatayamai is a species of beetles in the family Buprestidae, the only species in the genus Neomastogenius.

References

Monotypic Buprestidae genera